Dallas, the third-largest city in the U.S. state of Texas, is the site of 36 completed high-rise buildings over , 20 of which stand taller than . The tallest building in the city is the Bank of America Plaza, which rises  in Downtown Dallas and was completed in 1985. It also stands as the 3rd-tallest building in Texas and the 40th-tallest building in the United States. The second-tallest skyscraper in the city is the Renaissance Tower, which rises  and was completed in 1974. The Comerica Bank Tower, completed in 1987 and rising , is the third-tallest building in Dallas. Three of the ten tallest buildings in Texas are located in Dallas.

The history of skyscrapers in the city began with the construction of the Praetorian Building in 1909. That building, rising  and 14 floors, is often regarded as the first skyscraper in Dallas or even the entire Western United States; it was demolished in 2013. During the 1980s energy boom, the city saw a significant number of completed projects. There are  four buildings under construction that are planned to rise at least .



Tallest buildings
This height includes spires and architectural details, but does not include antenna masts. Freestanding observation towers are included for comparison purposes but not ranked.

Tallest under construction

, there are four buildings under construction in Dallas that are planned to rise at least .

Timeline of tallest buildings

Since 1909, the year the first high-rise in the city was constructed, the title of the tallest building in Dallas has been held by eight high-rises.

See also 
 List of tallest buildings in Texas / the United States / the world
 List of tallest buildings in Austin
 List of tallest buildings in Fort Worth
 List of tallest buildings in Houston
 List of tallest buildings in San Antonio
   
 List of tallest buildings in  Corpus Christi

Notes

References
 General

 Specific

External links
 Dallas Skyscraper Diagram on SkyscraperPage

Dallas
Dallas
Buildings and structures